Careless is a 2006 novel by Australian author Deborah Robertson.

Dedication
"For my brothers, Scott and Tony."

Plot summary
The novel follows the lives of four protagonists - Pearl, Anna, Sonia and Adam - who have all been touched by grief and despair. Suffering alone they are all drawn together by a tragic event.

Awards
International Dublin Literary Award, 2008: longlisted 
Commonwealth Writers Prize, South East Asia and South Pacific Region, Best Book, 2007: shortlisted 
Miles Franklin Literary Award, 2007: shortlisted 
Orange Prize for Fiction (UK), 2007: longlisted 
New South Wales Premier's Literary Awards, Christina Stead Prize for Fiction, 2007: shortlisted 
Nita Kibble Literary Award, 2007: winner 
Australian Book Industry Awards (ABIA), Australian Literary Fiction Book of the Year, 2007: shortlisted 
The Age Book of the Year Award, Fiction Prize, 2007: shortlisted 
Western Australian Premier's Book Awards, Fiction, 2006: shortlisted 
Colin Roderick Award, 2006: winner

References may be found on the individual award pages.

Reviews
Rachel Slater in Australian Women's Book Review noted: "Death and grief are central to this novel, and in particular the concept of public versus private grief and the questions around how art can deal with a subject of such magnitude...Careless offers an intimate yet shared portrayal of grief in all its complexities and reminds us that our promises of care can never really be kept."

References

2006 Australian novels